Ercolania  is a genus of small sacoglossan sea slugs, shell-less marine opisthobranch gastropod mollusks in the family Limapontiidae.

Species 
Species within the genus Ercolania include 24 valid species:
 Ercolania annelyleorum Wagele, Stemmer, Burghardt & Handeler, 2010
 Ercolania boodleae (Baba, 1938)
 Ercolania coerulea Trinchese, 1892
 Ercolania endophytophaga K. R. Jensen, 1999
 Ercolania erbsus (Ev. Marcus & Er. Marcus, 1970)
 Ercolania evelinae (Marcus, 1959)
 Ercolania felina (Hutton, 1882)
 Ercolania fuscata (Gould, 1870)
 Ercolania gopalai (Rao, 1937)
 Ercolania halophilae K. R. Jensen, Kohnert, Bendell & Schrödl, 2014
 Ercolania irregularis (Eliot, 1904)
 Ercolania kencolesi Grzymbowski, Stemmer & Wagele, 2007
 Ercolania lozanoi Ortea, 1981
 Ercolania margaritae Burn, 1974
 Ercolania nigra (Lemche, 1936)
 Ercolania pica (Annandale & Prashad, 1922)
 Ercolania raorum (Marcus & Marcus, 1970)
 Ercolania selva Ortea & Espinosa, 2001
 Ercolania subviridis (Baba, 1959)
 Ercolania talis (Ev. Marcus & Er. Marcus, 1956)
 Ercolania tentaculata (Eliot, 1917)
 Ercolania translucens Jensen, 1993
 Ercolania varians (Eliot, 1904)
 Ercolania viridis (A. Costa, 1866)
 Ercolania zanzibarica Eliot, 1903
Species brought into synonymy include
 Ercolania costai Pruvot-Fol, 1951
 Ercolania cricetae (Marcus & Marcus, 1970)
 Ercolania emarginata Jensen, 1985
 Ercolania funerea (Costa, 1867)
 Ercolania nigrovittata (A. Costa, 1866)
 Ercolania nigrovittata (Rao & Rao, 1963)
 Ercolania pancerii Trinchese, 1872
 Ercolania siottii Trinchese, 1872
 Ercolania trinchesii Pruvot-Fol, 1951
 Ercolania uziellii Trinchese, 1872
 Ercolania vanellus Marcus, 1957

References

 Trinchese S. (1872). Un nuovo genere della famiglia degli eolidei Ercolania Trinchese. Annali del Museo Civico di Storia Naturale di Genova 2: 86-132 + 10p
 Ortea, J., 1982. Moluscos Opistobranquios de las Islas Canarias. Boletín del Instituto Español de Oceanografía 6(327): 180-199
 Jensen, K.R. (2007). Biogeography of the Sacoglossa (Mollusca, Opisthobranchia). Bonner Zoologische Beiträge. 55: 255–281.

Limapontiidae